Samer Saeed Mujbel Al Mamoori (born 1 December 1987 in Iraq) is a former Iraqi midfielder. 

He currently manages Al-Diwaniya in the Iraqi Premier League.

Career
Saeed belongs among the generation of Iraqi players who emerged after 2003. As a teenager, he was recruited by Arbil FC, where he remained until 2006. After spending the next season with Baghdad-based Al-Quwa Al-Jawiya, he moved to Al-Ahly Tripoli in Libya in 2007. Saeed made a name for himself in his adopted country and was named Libya's ‘Best Foreign Player of the Year' in 2008.

International career
In his international debut, a friendly with Jordan on 24 January 2008, Samer Saeed donned the number 8 jersey, a number Ahmad Abd Ali had seemingly made his own in Iraq's title-winning campaign at the 2007 AFC Asian Cup. The game ended 1-1, with Saeed playing impressively in his creative role. Prior to this senior bow, the diminutive midfielder had figured prominently with the Iraqi Olympic side that won silver at the 2006 Asian Games in Doha.

Attributes
Standing just 165 cm tall, Saeed is one of the shortest players in the Iraqi team. But what he lacks in physical stature, the midfielder makes up for with pace, skill and creativity.

Managerial statistics

Honours

Country
 2006 Asian Games Silver medallist.

Clubs
 Libyan League Best foreign Player 2008

Personal
Samer is the twin brother of the Iraqi defender Samal Saeed and the older brother of Iraqi defender Sameh Saeed.

References

Profile on Goalzz

External links

Profile on Goalzz

1987 births
Living people
Iraqi footballers
Iraq international footballers
2009 FIFA Confederations Cup players
2011 AFC Asian Cup players
Iraqi expatriate footballers
Al-Sailiya SC players
Najaf FC players
People from Hillah
Association football midfielders
Asian Games medalists in football
Footballers at the 2006 Asian Games
Al-Talaba SC players
Al-Shorta SC players
Asian Games silver medalists for Iraq
Medalists at the 2006 Asian Games